Ausland is a small farming village in Gjerstad municipality in Agder county, Norway. The Sørlandsbanen railway line passes just south of the village area.

References

Villages in Agder
Gjerstad